Rebecca Louise Grundy (born 12 July 1990) is an English cricketer and coach, who played for her national cricket team and is now head coach of the Western Australia team. Grundy is a left-arm spin bowler.

Playing career
Grundy has played for Warwickshire.
In 2014, Grundy was part of the England Academy squad. Grundy was brought into the England squad for the 2014 ICC Women's World Twenty20 in Bangladesh. On pitches that generally help spin bowlers, Grundy made her England debut in the opening fixture of the tournament and retained her place through all the group matches. She was the holder of one of the first tranche of 18 ECB central contracts for women players, which were announced in April 2014.  Grundy was called up for the summer series against India and South Africa, which included her first Women's Test match and Women's One Day International callups. She later had to withdraw from the series with a groin injury. She played for England in the 2015 Women's Ashes series. Grundy was in the squad for the 2016 ICC Women's World Twenty20.

In total, Grundy made 21 appearances for England, and her last appearance for England was in 2016. At the end of 2016, she lost her central contract. Grundy played for Perth Scorchers in the 2016–17 Women's Big Bash League season, as a replacement for the injured Anya Shrubsole.

Grundy's nicknames are "Grunners" and "Carol". In 2015, she explained to sports journalist Clare Balding that the latter nickname was "as in Vorderman – we played Countdown on tour and I was in Carol’s position at the board."

Coaching career
Grundy worked as a development coach for the Western Australia women's cricket team. Whilst Grundy was a coach there, Western Australia won the 2019–20 Women's National Cricket League.
In May 2020, she was named as the head coach of Western Australia. She was signed on a two year contract.

References

External links
 
 

1990 births
Living people
England women Twenty20 International cricketers
Warwickshire women cricketers
South Western Districts women cricketers
Loughborough Lightning cricketers
Perth Scorchers (WBBL) cricketers
England women One Day International cricketers